GEA Group AG (Gesellschaft für Entstaubungsanlagen) is a German corporation, mostly active in the food and beverages sector, headquartered in Düsseldorf, Germany. The company is listed on the German MDAX.

History
The ancestor of today's GEA AG was Metallgesellschaft AG (MG), established as a metal trading company in 1881 in Frankfurt am Main in 1881 by Wilhelm Merton together with Leo Ellinger (born November 21, 1852, in Frankfurt am Main; died July 16, 1916, there). 

Between 1881 and 1914, MG was already represented on all continents and invested in mines and metallurgical plants. Due to World War I, it lost a large proportion of foreign investments and started chemical trading. 
In 1920, Gesellschaft für Entstaubungsanlagen (GEA) was founded by Otto Happel, to produce de-dusting equipment.

Nazi era 
When the Nazis came to power in Germany in 1933, Alfred and Richard Merton were expelled from all public offices by the National Socialists because of their Jewish origins.  Alfred emigrated to the USA in 1934, and Richard was imprisoned in the Buchenwald concentration camp during the November pogroms in 1938. His private property was confiscated, and he was able to flee with his family to London in 1939. Subsequently, as part of the Aryanization process, the German Reich appointed a state commissioner as chairman of the board of the company, which was important for the war economy.

In 1946, the Metallgesellschaft participated in the founding of the Frankfurter Trümmerverwertungsgesellschaft (Frankfurt Rubble Utilization Company), which received attention throughout Germany and the world. From 1949 to 1960, the company's processing plant for rubble in Frankfurt-Bornheim produced building materials for the reconstruction of some 100,000 buildings destroyed in the air raids on Frankfurt.

In 1947, the OMGUS report determined that Metallgesellschaft was not a beneficiary of the war economy. The U.S. investigator in charge also emphasized that the company neither employed concentration camp workers nor specifically participated in the war machine. The company's production facilities were not spared bombing during World War II, but were able to resume operations soon after the war ended. However, the loss of the eastern territories meant that the company lost an important raw materials market.

Postwar 
Richard Merton returned from exile to Frankfurt in 1948 and became a member of the company's Supervisory Board.  Due to World War II, MG's and GEA's production facilities suffered extensive destruction. Production started up again with about 70 employees in a small, undamaged building a few weeks after the war ended. At that time, many business transactions--including salaries--were barter deals. While reconstruction work progressed in the following years, the company was hit hard once again. The day after Christmas in 1948, GEA's founder Otto Happel died. His widow, Elisabeth Happel just eleven months earlier, took over the company's management. In the late 1940s and early 1950s, the reconstruction of power plants helped GEA get back on track.

Following the reconstructions, numerous innovations ensured the future of the company. In 1989, GEA went public and an era of expansion and globalization started. 1991-1995 GEA executed several acquisitions including Grasso, Niro, Westfalia Separator and Tuchenhagen. MG also made a key decision with the acquisition of Dynamit Nobel AG, which resulted in entering the chemical industry.
 
The 1990 oil price shock caused oil-business loss in the US, which pushed MG into crisis. MG answered with a fundamental realignment marking the transition to an innovative focus technology group. Restructuring entailed a divestment of around 300 group companies and set the focus on chemicals and engineering.

In 1999, Metallgesellschaft acquired GEA AG and in 2000 was renamed to mg technologies ag. In 2003, the enterprise went through another strategic reorganization to specialize in special purpose machinery with a focus on process engineering, components and plant engineering.

2005 brought important changes again in the form of selling the Dynamit Nobel Plastics business unit and renaming the company to GEA Group Aktiengesellschaft. The reorganization did not stop there. In 2015, the “OneGEA” project was introduced, implementing a new integrated group structure with two main business areas as “Equipment” and “Solutions” as well as a uniform country organization. The technology portfolio expanded with the acquisitions of CMT, Comas and Hilge.

GEA is a member of ”Blue Competence”, an initiative of the German Engineering Association (VDMA).

See also
 Automated milking

References

Engineering companies of Germany
Manufacturing companies based in Düsseldorf
Dairy farming equipment manufacturers
Manufacturing companies established in 1881
German companies established in 1881
Companies in the MDAX